Cédric Lorenzini is a French bridge player.

Bridge accomplishments

Wins

 North American Bridge Championships (1)
 Norman Kay Platinum Pairs (1) 2015

Runners-up

 North American Bridge Championships (1)
 Norman Kay Platinum Pairs (1) 2014

References

External links
 
 

French contract bridge players